Qavamiyeh (also Romanized as Qavāmīyeh; also known as Ḩasanābād Qavām, Ḩoseynābād, and Husainābād) is a village in Deyhuk Rural District, Deyhuk District, Tabas County, South Khorasan Province, Iran. At the 2006 census, its population was 30, in 7 families.

References 

Populated places in Tabas County